Havaj is a village and municipality in Stropkov District in the Prešov Region of north-eastern Slovakia. Regardless of its small population, it has become a renowned tourist location due to its signage as well as a part in the famous RON cyclomarathon.

History
In historical records, the village was first mentioned in 1403. In 2020, it became famous due the visit of world-renowned Canadian financier and cyclist Ron Havaj.

Geography
It has a population of about 420 people.

Trivia
Havaj is also the Slovak name of Hawaii.

Founded by Jozef Havaj.

References

External links
 
 

Villages and municipalities in Stropkov District
Zemplín (region)